The MG F and MG TF are mid-engined, rear wheel drive roadster cars that were sold under the MG marque by three manufacturers between 1995 and 2011.

The MG F was the first new model designed as an MG since the MGB that was produced from 1962 to 1980, the marque spent the 1980s being used to denote performance models from then parent Austin Rover Group, and was briefly seen on the MG RV8, a limited edition relaunch of the MG MGB which was sold between 1993 and 1995.

The MG F was initially designed by Rover Group during the period it was owned by British Aerospace and was brought to market after the business had been sold to the German car manufacturer BMW. The BMW owned Rover Group manufactured the model from 1995 to 2000. BMW broke up Rover Group in 2000, divesting the Rover and MG passenger car businesses to a management buy-out who formed the independent MG Rover business. MG Rover manufactured the MG F from 2000 onwards, heavily updating it to become the MG TF in 2002.

MG Rover entered administration in 2005, resulting in the production of the MG TF model ceasing. The remains of the MG Rover business were sold to Nanjing Automobile and the MG TF resumed production under the Nanjing owned MG Motor in 2007. The model, by then heavily outdated, was not a sales success and production ceased for a second and final time in 2011.

History
MG had stopped producing sports cars in 1980 when British Leyland closed their Abingdon, Oxfordshire plant, although the badge of MG was used on badge-engineered hatchbacks and saloons between 1982 and 1991.

In 1992, the company (by this time Rover Group) restarted production of the classic MGB as the limited edition RV8, and positive reaction led the company to continue to develop the MG F. During the 1980s, a number of new MG sports cars had been hinted at with the appearance of concept cars at motor shows, but none of these cars ever went into production.

By 1991, Rover was working on a new mid-engined sports car similar in size (and expected to be similar in price) to the recently launched Mazda MX5 and Lotus Elan. The final product, the MG F, was finally unveiled on 8 March 1995, and went on sale in September that year with a 1.8 litre 120 bhp engine, and was joined several months later by a 145 bhp VVC (variable valve control) version. It was hugely popular and received plaudits for its excellent ride and handling. The MG F received a mild facelift in August 1999, by which time a high performance Supersport version was reportedly in the pipeline, but this version was never launched; the highest performance MG F model was the 160 bhp Trophy model which joined the range a year after the facelift.

It was revised and renamed using the historic TF name in January 2002, but production was halted, following the collapse of the MG Rover Group in April 2005. However, after Nanjing Automobile Group acquired the rights to the MG TF, the completion of the new factory for MG in Nanjing saw production being restarted in March 2007 before finally being stopped in 2011 without an immediate successor.

MG F

Mark I

The MG F was launched in the autumn of 1995 by the Rover Group, making it the third car to be launched after the takeover by BMW. It was powered by a 1.8 L K-Series 16-valve engine, the basic having 118 hp (87 kW) while the more powerful VVC (variable valve control) had 143 hp (107 kW). Rover Special Projects oversaw the development of the F's design and before finalising the styling bought-in outside contractors to determine the most appropriate mechanical configuration for the new car.

Steve Harper of MGA Developments produced the initial design concept in January 1991 (inspired by the Jaguar XJR-15 and the Ferrari 250LM), before Rover's in-house design team refined the concept under the leadership of Gerry McGovern. An interesting feature of the F was its Hydragas  suspension, a system employing interconnected fluid and gas displacers which provided a surprisingly compliant ride but which could be tuned to provide excellent handling characteristics.

The MG F quickly shot to the top of the affordable sports car charts in Britain and remained there until the introduction of the MG TF in 2002.

Mark II 
The MG F underwent a facelift in autumn of 1999, and gave the car a revised interior as well as styling tweaks and fresh alloy wheels designs. There was also the introduction of a base 1.6 version and a more powerful 1.8L 160 hp (119 kW) variant called the Trophy 160 in 2001, which had a 0-60 mph time of 6.9 seconds. The Trophy was only produced for a limited time.

An automatic version with a CVT called the Steptronic was introduced in 2001. The MG F continued to sell well in spite of the sale of the Rover Group, which was announced in March 2000. Land Rover was sold to Ford, while the MG and Rover marques were sold to the Phoenix consortium for £10. In spite of competition from the likes of Mazda MX-5, BMW Z3 and Audi TT, the MG F still proved popular, remaining Britain's best selling convertible car. A total of 77,269 MG F's were built. And 799 Limited versions.

EXF 
Project EXF represents a limited production of five single-seat MG F sports cars that allude to historic land-speed records set by MG between 1930 and 1959. Known simply as the F, the MG car features largely standard MG F components, a turbocharged 1.4L (329 bhp) Rover K-Series engine, and a drag coefficient of less than 0.25.

Engines

MG TF

In 2002, the MG TF was released, named after the MG TF Midget of the 1950s. Based upon the MG F platform, but heavily redesigned and reengineered, the most significant mechanical changes were the abandonment of Hydragas suspension in favour of conventional coil springs, the new design of the air induction system that along with new camshafts produces more power than in MG F engines, and the torsional stiffness of the body increased by 20%.

Various cosmetic changes include a revised grille, redesigned front headlights, bumpers, side air-intake grills, rear boot, etc. It held a decent amount of sales despite problems including uneven shut lines on the drivers door on models for the United Kingdom. Production was suspended in April 2005, when MG Rover collapsed. 39,249 MG TFs were built from 2002 until 2005.

Safety
The MG TF was assessed with four star safety performance from Euro NCAP and ANCAP.

Engines

Nanjing Automobile Group production

In March 2007, Nanjing Automobile Group, which bought MG Rover's remaining assets during bankruptcy proceedings, restarted production of the MG TF at its Nanjing factory, with a capacity of 200,000 cars a year. Experts from the Longbridge factory were involved in building the new TFs in Nanjing.

In August 2008, more than three years after the facility had closed due to the bankruptcy of MG Rover, assembly of a lightly revised MG TF model for the European market, from Chinese built complete knock down (CKD) kits, was started by NAC MG UK at Longbridge.

The first TF model to be produced by NAC MG UK was the TF LE500.  As the name suggests, this was a limited edition of five hundred cars each individually numbered. The better suspension set-up and the heated rear window from the 2005 model TF were carried over to the LE500. Styling was reminiscent of the original MGF, with an intake on either side of the MG badge, and a large single intake below the number plate.

The LE500 specification includes leather seats, hard top and soft top, wind stop, CD tuner with MP3 compatibility, rear parking sensors, sixteen inch eleven spoke alloy wheels, and front fog lights. It was priced higher than a modern Mazda MX5 despite its few changes from 2002, which had a large negative effect on sales.

The LE500 was followed by the model TF 135 and a further limited edition TF 85th Anniversary, of which only fifty were ever produced.

Production of the TF at Longbridge was suspended again in October 2009, due to low demand in face of the recession. Production resumed in the new year, but the end of production was finally announced in March 2011, due to lack of demand and component supply problems. A total of 906 TFs were produced at Longbridge under Chinese ownership.

Concept Cars

XPower 500 
Created by the XPower division of the MG Rover Group in 2001 as a one off to show the brand new XPower division and also to show what the engineers could do. The car was designed to accommodate the brand new XP-20 engine used in the MG-Lola EX257 race car with a Garrett turbocharger with an anti-lag system which achieves 500PS. The Power then goes through a 6 Speed sequential gearbox manufactured by X-Trac.

When built in 2001, the car was equipped with several upgrades over the standard car. It featured a seam welded bodyshell with a fully integrated T45 roll cage with strengthened subframes. The chassis comes complete with a Limited-slip differential, independent racing suspension and upgraded 4-Pot AP Racing Brakes. The car has 17" multi-spoke alloy racing wheels with 225/13 R17 tyres on the front, 265/13 R17 tyres on the rear and a bespoke rear wing.

Initially the XPower concept was designed for a brand new wild version of the MG TF, this never came around however and no concept car for a production XPower TF was created. Reportedly the car was set to feature a de-tuned XP-20 engine used in the XPower 500 concept and the MG-Lola race cars with around 300PS but the idea wasn't developed beyond the planning stage.

MG TF GT 

Designed in 2005, at Dove in Norfolk by Peter Stevens and his team, at the same time as the Rover 75 Coupé, is the coupe MG TF, called the GT, similar to the Pininfarina designed MGB GT. It was unveiled before MG Rover Group collapsed in April 2005, and was shown at several events such as the AutoRAI in Amsterdam, alongside other cars such as the MG XPower SV.

The concept car was developed from a top of the range TF 160, and came with a grenadine interior (a rare option typically in the top of range TF's), brand new lowered bucket seats, 17" OZ five spoke wheels, a front splitter to improve aerodynamics and for the first time in a production/factory TF a 2.5L Rover KV6 engine. It was reported on forums for MG that the engine was changed to a standard 160 VVC 1.8L K Series sometime in 2005, although this is disputed and is also disputed as to whether the car received a KV6 in the first place.

When launched the car posed several problems. The first of the problems with the coupe is engine access which because the car is a mid rear arrangement posed several problems and made the car hard to work on, it is reported that the subframe had to be removed in order to work on the engine. The second problem is the KV6 powerplant which had to have a bespoke smaller fuel tank to fit in the engine bay as the standard fuel tank wouldn't fit. Although disputed as to whether the car received the KV6 powerplant in the first place it now seems likely however, as ex-MG engineer Chris Flanagan produced his own 2.5 KV6 MGF in 2004 and has subsequently produced further KV6 engined TFs at Retro Sports Cars Ltd in Yorkshire.

Former engineers at MG Rover reported that the car was close to entering production, and as soon as the end of 2005, the car could have been sold. However MG Rover went into receivership, and progress was halted. Nanjing were set to revive the idea and manufacture in the US in a brand new factory in Oklahoma employing 500 people. This idea also never came about with the LE500 and TF135 being the only TF produced by Nanjing at Longbridge, rather than a new purpose built facility in Oklahoma.

Reception
Throughout its production, the MG sold successfully. In a number of road tests, the MG F impressed, and was a match for its main rivals the Mazda MX-5 and BMW Z3 in terms of handling, performance and practicality, but build quality, reliability and dealer support within the United Kingdom were poor in comparison to its Japanese and German rivals.

However, after Nanjiing took over and restarted production, the car's sales plummeted, until production was eventually ceased in March 2011.

Parker's gave the car 2.5/5 and said its pros were "Styling, handling and brand heritage" and cons were "Dated interior, patchy build quality and poor reliability."

What Car? gave it 2/5 saying its pros were that it is "pretty and affordable" but its cons were "The driving position and steering are not what you'd expect in such a sporty car."

Auto Express reviewed it after Nanjiing took over, and also had a verdict of 2/5, liking how it was "well equipped and compact" but disliking how it was priced more expensive than a basic Mazda MX-5, stating it has "barely changed since 1995, and can be mistaken for a much older vehicle" and also commenting on its cramped interior.

The engine of K Series used in the MG F has gained a reputation for head gasket failure. This is mainly due to the design and placement of the thermostat, however the installation of the headgasket was also a major factor. Other factors include insufficient width between the cylinders, build tolerances, block face stiffness, casting quality, gasket material, and cooling system layout (the engine is at the back and the radiator is at the front).

Due to the placement of the thermostat on the intake side of the water pump at the base of the block the head can overheat before sufficient heat is transmitted through the block to allow the thermostat to open. Thermal shock from cooling the block rapidly and the thermostat closing abruptly due to cold water from the radiator cooling the opening spring can result in insufficient coolant reaching as far as the head, which can cause different expansion and contraction rates between the head and the block.

This combined with the early practice of installing the head gasket with plastic locating dowels, which subsequently melted when the engines overheated, allowed the head gaskets to "walk." A redesigned head gasket, which consists of a multiple layer metal gasket or "MLS" used in conjunction with steel locating dowels, is alleged to significantly reduce the chance of a head gasket failure.

There is no replacement engine that is a suitable replacement for the motor of K Series. Apart from the head gasket problem, MGF and TF models are said to have few major faults.

The engine for the K Series was sourced from the existing Rover line and was mainly intended as a front engined commuter vehicle power source. The design compromise of locating the thermostat on the pump intake rather than the head outlet originates in this original use. A common aftermarket modification by those who intend to drive their MGFs spiritedly is to install an Inline thermostat in the outlet pipe from the head to the radiator. This head gasket problem is also found on K series engined Lotus Elises and is also commonly solved by thermostat relocation.

References

External links
 MG Motor UK
 MG Car Club

F TF
Rear mid-engine, rear-wheel-drive vehicles
Mid-engined cars
Roadsters
Euro NCAP roadster sports cars
2000s cars
2010s cars
Cars introduced in 1995